Thomas Muster was the defending champion, but lost in the semifinals to Fabrice Santoro.

Goran Ivanišević won the title by defeating Santoro 6–2, 4–6, 4–6, 6–3, 6–2 in the final.

Seeds
All seeds received a bye to the second round.

Draw

Finals

Top half

Section 1

Section 2

Bottom half

Section 3

Section 4

References

External links
 Official results archive (ATP)
 Official results archive (ITF)

Singles
Austrian Open Kitzbühel